All India Indira Congress (Secular) was a regional political party in Rajasthan, India. All India Indira Congress (Secular) was formed when Sis Ram Ola split from the Indian National Congress. All India Indira Congress (Secular) merged with Congress in 2002.

See also 
Indian National Congress breakaway parties

References

Political parties in Rajasthan
Defunct political parties in India
Indian National Congress breakaway groups
1997 establishments in Rajasthan
2002 disestablishments in India